Energen Corporation was a company engaged in hydrocarbon exploration. In 2018, the company was acquired by Diamondback Energy.

, the company had  of proved reserves, of which 58% was petroleum, 22% was natural gas, and 20% was and natural gas liquids and all of which were in the Permian Basin.

History
The company, originally called Alabama Gas Corporation, was spun off from Southern Natural Gas (later, Sonat Inc.) in 1953 as part of an antitrust agreement.

In 1985, the company was renamed Energen Corporation. Its subsidiaries included its natural gas utility division, Alagasco (Alabama Gas Corporation), which was sold in 2014, and its oil and gas exploration division, Taurus Exploration (later Energen Resources).

In 2002, Energen Resources acquired properties in the Permian Basin for $120 million in cash and $70 million in stock.

In 2003, Energen Resources acquired 93 billion cubic feet of gas equivalent of proved reserves in the San Juan Basin of New Mexico and southern Colorado for $39 million.

In 2004, Energen Resources acquired San Juan Basin coalbed methane properties from a private company for $273 million.

In 2009, the company acquired assets in the Permian Basin from Range Resources for $182 million.

In 2014, the company sold its natural gas utility business, Alabama Gas Corporation (Alagasco), to Laclede Group for $1.35 billion in cash and the assumption of $250 million in debt.

In 2015, the company sold the majority of its assets in the San Juan Basin for $395 million.

In 2018, the company was acquired by Diamondback Energy.

References

1979 establishments in Alabama
2018 mergers and acquisitions
Defunct oil companies of the United States
Energy companies established in 1979
Energy companies disestablished in 2018
Non-renewable resource companies established in 1979
Companies based in Birmingham, Alabama